Wispington is a village in the civil parish of Edlington with Wispington (where th population is included) in the East Lindsey district of Lincolnshire, England.

The former parish church is a Grade II listed building dedicated to Saint Margaret was built in 1863 by John Atkinson of York and consists of a western tower, nave, chancel, south porch and vestry. It is constructed of grey sandstone. In the interior, the font, pulpit and a relief of St Margaret were all carved in stone by the vicar, Rev Charles Pratt Terrot. Monuments are dedicated to the Philips family, one dated 1715, the other 1720. This family lived at Hall Farm, Wispington during late 16th to early 17th century. The church was declared redundant by the Diocese of Lincoln in 1975, and is now closed.

References

External links

Villages in Lincolnshire
East Lindsey District